This is the list of the episodes for the American cooking television series and competition Iron Chef America, produced by Food Network. The series is based on the Japanese series Iron Chef and is a cooking competition in which a challenger chef "battles" one of the resident "Iron Chefs" by cooking five or more dishes in a one-hour time slot based around a secret ingredient or ingredients, and sometimes theme. In most episodes, three judges score the meal in three categories, with 10 points available to each judge for taste, 5 points for creativity, and 5 points for presentation, for a possible total of 60 points. Exceptions are noted for individual episodes.

Episodes

Battle of the Masters: 2004
Iron Chef America was first aired as a mini-series entitled Iron Chef America: Battle of the Masters. For Battle of the Masters, two of the original Iron Chefs competed along with three Food Network personalities in various match ups with one another.

 This is Wolfgang Puck's only battle as an Iron Chef.
 This episode had four judges, and thus a maximum possible score of 80.

Season 1: 2005

 Roberto Donna completed only two of the required five dishes. 
 The cheeses in this battle consisted of five traditional Italian cheeses: mascarpone, ricotta, Parmigiano-Reggiano, gorgonzola and mozzarella.

Season 2: 2005

Tamara Murphy is the first female challenger to lose to the Iron Chef. The three previous female competitors won their respective battles.
In this match Milliken and Feniger only had one sous-chef to adhere to the three-to-a-kitchen rule.

Season 3: 2006–2007

 Roberto Donna is the first chef to request a re-match.
 First aired on Food Network Canada on May 3, 2006.
 Eme brought only one sous-chef to the competition; his other sous-chef was needed to operate his restaurant in his absence. Eme is married to actress Jeri Ryan, who later served as a judge on ICA.
 Chef Morou won a Washington D.C. preliminary competition in December, 2005 for the chance to compete on the show.
 Patricia Yeo is the first former ICA sous chef (under Bobby Flay) to compete against an Iron Chef. 
 Elizabeth Falkner was a sous chef under Cat Cora for several ICA episodes. 
 This was a special 90-minute episode that pitted two guest Food Network personalities against each other. Each personality was paired with an Iron Chef.

 Walter Royal had a third sous chef for the first five minutes of the competition.  This sous chef, who primarily participated by peeling potatoes, was a 12-year-old working in a mentor program with Chef Royal.

 This first aired on the Throwdown! with Bobby Flay Marathon on January 1, 2007.

Season 4: 2007

 First aired on Food Network Canada on February 11, 2007.
 Lynn Crawford is the first Canadian woman to compete in Kitchen Stadium. She is a Food Network Canada personality as part of the series Restaurant Makeover.
 This episode featured a guest mixologist paired with each competing chef. The mixologists were required to prepare a drink to accompany each dish that also highlighted the secret ingredient. The drinks were judged on a 10-point scale (6 for taste, two each for presentation and creativity) which was added to the chef's score for the final score, thus giving a total possible score of 90 points per team.

 Consisted of bacon, various breads, chicken eggs, maple syrup, orange juice, and pork sausage.
 Chosen to highlight grilling as a cooking method as part of Food Network's "Grillin' & Chillin'" Week.

Season 5: 2007

Consisted of fresh ingredients purchased from the Green Market at Union Square in New York City, including a variety of winter vegetables, fruit and guinea fowl.
An ICA special based around Symon's debut battle as an Iron Chef.
Other than his preference for farm-fresh ingredients, no formal specialty was announced for Moore. This is the cuisine style attributed to Agraria in Washington, D.C., where Moore is executive chef.
Consisted of traditional American Thanksgiving staples: turkey, sweet potatoes, cranberries, corn, and pumpkin.
An ICA special which featured two teams of Food Network personalities facing off in a holiday dessert battle, with each team having one sous chef instead of the usual two.
First aired on Food Network on January 20, 2008, after the first two episodes of Season 6 were broadcast.

Season 6: 2008

Oliver's sous chefs were Gennaro Contaldo, his mentor at London's Neal Street Restaurant and his "mate" Andrew Parkinson, also a trained chef, both of whom have previously appeared with him on his television programs.
First aired on Food Network on January 1, 2008, following a marathon replay of The Next Iron Chef.
First aired on Food Network Canada on February 10, 2008 as part of a chocolate-themed program marathon.
First aired during "Brain Freeze Week". In keeping with the theme, the Chairman stipulated each dish must include a frozen element.

Season 7: 2008–2009

According to the program notes, Adjey and Symon were roommates at the Culinary Institute of America. Adjey is also a Food Network Canada personality as part of the series Restaurant Makeover.
Art Smith is the first Iron Chef America judge to later appear as a challenger. 
Cosentino was a competitor with Symon on the first The Next Iron Chef, and was previously defeated by Mario Batali in Battle Garlic.
A special Halloween episode, featuring organ meats (heart, kidney, sweetbreads, tripe, liver) from a variety of animals along with off-cuts such as pig's trotters and coxcomb. The episode also featured appearances by Igor and The Monster from the Broadway production of "Young Frankenstein."
This is the first episode in which the new Iron Chef jackets are worn.
Secret ingredients included duck, heritage turkey, venison, walnuts, Indian corn, lobster and leeks.
One of Amanda Freitag's sous chefs was Ariane Duarte, a contestant on the fifth season of Top Chef.  Duarte is not a chef at Freitag's restaurant.
Kaysen was a former competitor on The Next Iron Chef; this was his first battle in Kitchen Stadium.
Takeo and Shintaro Okamoto previously appeared on Will Work for Food, training Adam Gertler to sculpt ice for an event.

Season 8: 2010

A twin-themed battle, featuring Michael Symon lookalike Psilakis (who previously lost to Cat Cora in Battle Puff Pastry), the twin Carro brothers, and twin judges Tia and Tamera Mowry.
There were four judges for this battle, thus a highest possible score of 80, as compared to normal episodes which have three judges and a highest possible score of 60.
First Lady Michelle Obama appeared as a special guest at the beginning of this two-hour episode, where she welcomed the chefs and announced the secret ingredient. This is also the last battle featuring Batali as part of the regular cast; it was announced in September 2007 that Batali's contract with Food Network was not being renewed.
In Kitchen Stadium, the Chairman supplemented the secret ingredient with a range of locally and sustainably grown meats and seafood, along with goat cheese, eggs, cider vinegar and honey from the White House beehive.
Garces' debut as Iron Chef, having won the second season of The Next Iron Chef competition
Michael Smith is the host of Food Network Canada's "Chef at Home".
Goldman is also the host of Food Network's Ace of Cakes. His experiences on ICA are included in Ace of Cakes episode DB0808L ("Charm City Throwdown").  Goldman's sous chefs were his former mentor, Jean Llapitan, and Shawn Aoki from the Palace Hotel, San Francisco.
Richard Blais, who previously competed against Iron Chef Batali in Battle Chickpeas, joins Cat Cora's team as a sous chef.
Smith competed on the second season of The Next Iron Chef; this is her first battle in Kitchen Stadium
Zakarian appears regularly as a judge on Chopped (TV series).
Fraser requested permission to compete without sous chefs; Symon dismissed his upon learning Fraser was competing alone.
This battle was a special grill battle, where each dish was to include a grilled element.
Makoto Okuwa was a sous chef under Iron Chef Morimoto for several ICA episodes.
Crenn competed on the second season of The Next Iron Chef; this is her first battle in Kitchen Stadium
This episode was Iron Chef America's first vegetarian battle.
Seamus Mullen competed on the second season of The Next Iron Chef; this is his first battle in Kitchen Stadium.
Eric Greenspan competed on the second season of The Next Iron Chef; this is his first battle in Kitchen Stadium.

Season 9: 2010–2011
A modification to the judging was made this season.  At the end of each chef's presentation, the Chairman asked each judge to sum up their impressions of the chef's dishes, although not every episode includes this segment.

Marc Forgione's debut as an Iron Chef, having won season three of The Next Iron Chef.  Forgione previously served as a sous chef for Laurent Tourondel in Battle Goat Cheese during Season 3. 
There were four judges for this episode, thus a maximum possible score of 80.
Anne Burrell previously served as one of Mario Batali's sous chefs and hosted the Food Network series Secrets of a Restaurant Chef and Worst Cooks in America.
Iron Chef Cat Cora along with Paula Deen previously defeated Chef Robert Irvine along with Chef Tyler Florence in Battle Sugar.
Chuck Hughes is the host of the Cooking Channel's Chuck's Day Off.
Chef Medina's sous chef, J.C. Pavlovich, previously served as a sous chef for Iron Chef Bobby Flay in multiple battles.
At age 24, Hearst is the youngest challenger in series history.
Iron Chef Jose Garces was the first to receive a perfect score.

Season 10: 2011–2012

Chef Lee Anne Wong appears on Cooking Channel's "Unique Eats".
The fruitcake used in the episode was Alton Brown's "Free Range Fruitcake" from the Good Eats episode "It's a Wonderful Cake".
Zakarian's debut as an Iron Chef, having won season four of The Next Iron Chef. Iron Chef Zakarian received a perfect score.
Chef Marcela Valladolid appear as the host of the Food Network show Mexican Made Easy. Chef Andrew Zimmern appears on Travel Channel's series Bizarre Foods with Andrew Zimmern and Andrew Zimmern's Bizarre World.
Sea Whistle salmon is sustainably farmed salmon raised off the coasts of Scotland and Ireland in the North Atlantic.
Each judge could award a maximum of 30 points, 20 for food and 10 for the paired cocktails, for a maximum possible score of 90 points.
Chef Jonathan Sawyer was a sous chef under Iron Chef Michael Symon for several ICA episodes.
This battle was a special Tailgate Showdown battle.  Each chef prepared five dishes to be prepared and served in the manner of tailgating. The battle was held at the Marine Corps Base Hawaii at Kane'ohe Bay, Oahu.
Chef Joey Campanaro previously lost to Iron Chef Cat Cora in Battle Venison; his brother Lou served as one of his sous chefs in the battle.
Chef Madison Cowan previously appeared on Chopped, and is the first Chopped Grand Champion.  His sous chefs were fellow Chopped competitor Lance Nitahara and Chopped judge Amanda Freitag, who competed against Iron Chef Jose Garces in The Next Iron Chef.
 A special three-way battle in which each Iron Chef was paired with a chef from a branch of the U.S. military. The battle was held at the U. S. Marine Base Hawaii at Kane'ohe Bay, Oahu. Each team made only three dishes instead of the usual five.
 Iron Chef Symon also battled in the previous Battle Octopus, which he lost.
 There were four judges for this episode, thus a maximum possible score of 80.
 Ingredients included whelk, hearts of palm, coconuts and drinking coconuts, pineapple and mango.  Each dish was paired with a cocktail. Each judge could award a maximum of 30 points, 20 for food and 10 for the paired cocktails, for a maximum possible score of 90 points.

Season 11: 2012–2013

Starting in Season 11, the first dish is due to the judges 20 minutes after the start of the battle. Additionally, a culinary curveball—an ingredient, piece of equipment, or plating device—is announced by the chairman part way through the battle. Each chef is required to integrate the item into at least one of their remaining dishes, and receives scoring from the judges based on the item's use. Up to 30 points are awarded for taste, 15 for plating, 15 for creativity, 15 for the first dish, and 15 for use of the culinary curveball, for a possible total of 90 points.

Iron Chef America Tournament of Champions
In this first ever Iron Chef vs. Iron Chef tournament, the four newest Chefs compete to take on either Iron Chef Symon or Iron Chef Morimoto, with the winners of those battles going head-to-head.  Bobby Flay served as head judge in the finale.

Season 11, continued

 Chefs Aaron Sanchez, Scott Conant and Marc Murphy appear regularly as a judges on Chopped (TV series). Chef Aarón Sanchez previously tied Iron Chef Masaharu Morimoto in Battle Black Bass (Season 2), and Chef Marc Murphy previously lost to Iron Chef Bobby Flay in Battle Breakfast (Season 4).
This battle features three chefs representing Food Network versus three chefs representing The Cooking Channel. Chef Irvine has appeared twice previously on Iron Chef America, as well as competing in The Next Iron Chef season 4.  Ted Allen is the host of Chopped, and a regular judge on Iron Chef America. Nadia G. hosts Bitchin' Kitchen, and Ben Sargent hosts Hook, Line and Dinner on The Cooking Channel.
This battle is Guarnaschelli's debut as an Iron Chef, having won season 5 of The Next Iron Chef. She served as a sous chef for Iron Chef Geoffrey Zakarian during season 10. Chef Judy Joo appears as an Iron Chef on Iron Chef UK and was a judge on the fourth season of "The Next Iron Chef", in which Iron Chef Guarnaschelli previously competed.
Chef Kittichai previously lost to Iron Chef Batali in Battle Lentils in season 3.  Chef Kittichai appears as an Iron Chef on Iron Chef Thailand.
Chef Tio was a participant in season three of "The Next Iron Chef", in which Iron Chef Symon was a Judge.
This is a rematch between Iron Chef Morimoto and Chef Cantu. In Battle Beet, Chef Cantu defeated IC Morimoto by one point.
Iron Chef Forgione served as the sous chef for his father during this match.

Season 12: 2013–2014

 Chef Spike Mendelsohn previously lost to Iron Chef Michael Symon in Battle Prosciutto in season 8.
 The secret ingredient consisted of five "scary" pairs of ingredient:  avocado and coffee, chile and vanilla, pickle and peanut butter, mushrooms and apricots, and marrow bones and fruit candy.  The chefs were required to prepare one dish using each combination of ingredients. The Culinary Curveball consisted of one trick and one treat hidden from the chefs' view; the challengers, having won the first dish, were given first choice of ingredient and chose the trick.
 The secret ingredient consisted of the chairman's favorite ingredients from past holiday competitions:  fruitcake, gingerbread, egg nog, and champagne.
 The curveball consisted of three different presents. The winning team from the first dish picked first and got apple cider. The other two teams got candy canes and popcorn.
 Each of the dishes prepared must be eaten with one hand. The ingredients include artificial cheese, hero rolls, and hot dogs.
The secret ingredient consisted of caviar, wagyu beef, oysters, Maine lobsters, champagne, chocolate and truffles. 
The secret ingredient included shrimp, octopus, prosciutto, and beef. 
Chef Elizabeth Falkner previously lost to Iron Chef Cat Cora in Battle Honey in season 3. 
The secret ingredient included suckling pig, tuna, lichee, coconut, banana, pineapple, papaya, and Kona coffee from which the chefs must create five desserts. The chefs were required to use five of the ingredients from the table and no butter or sugar in the first dish. 
 The secret ingredient includes gin, vermouth, tequila, pork rinds, cherries, and olives. It also includes anything found at a bar.
 The episode theme is a play on the 1960s film "It's a Mad, Mad, Mad, Mad World" and the secret ingredient includes: water chesnuts, Granny Smith apples, iceberg lettuce, kumquats and more. Each dish had to have a take on drinks from the 1960s.

Iron Chef Showdown

Iron Chef returned to Food Network on November 8, 2017 as a ten episode series called Iron Chef Showdown. Iron Chefs Bobby Flay, Jose Garces, Alex Guarnaschelli, and Michael Symon return for this series; they are joined by the newest Iron Chef, Iron Chef Gauntlet winner Stephanie Izard. Iron Chef Showdown featured several rules differences from Iron Chef America and is therefore considered a series of its own rather than the thirteenth season of Iron Chef America. Iron Chef America would return to the air six months later, in May 2018.

Season 13: 2018 
Food Network announced that Iron Chef America would return in its original format, with new episodes beginning May 20, 2018. Two format changes implemented in Iron Chef Showdown were retained: the number of judges has been reduced to two, and there is no Culinary Curveball. 

Each judge can award up to 25 points: 10 for flavor, 5 for plating, 5 for creativity, and 5 for the first dish, for a total of 50 points. Alongside the judges, the Chairman sits at judge's table during judging. This season Jet Tila serves as the floor reporter, succeeding Kevin Brauch and Jaymee Sire.

As an additional requirement, at least one ingredient or element of each dish was required to be grilled.

Win–loss records
The winning percentage for Iron Chefs participating on Iron Chef America is an average. The win/loss data is based solely on the performance of the participant as an Iron Chef in Iron Chef America: The Series and the Battle of the Masters but does not include the results from Iron Chef Showdown.

 Based on weighted average (.5 victory for a draw). The win/loss data is based on the performance of the Iron Chef in Iron Chef America: The Series and the Battle of the Masters.
 Flay retired as Iron Chef at the end of Iron Chef Showdown.
 Forgione's record does not include his victory over Marco Canora in the finale of The Next Iron Chef as Forgione did not hold the title Iron Chef during that battle.
 Garces' record does not include his defeat of Flay in Battle Melon, or his victory over Jehangir Mehta in the finale of The Next Iron Chef as Garces did not hold the title Iron Chef during either battle.
 Guarnaschelli's record does not include her loss to Cora in Battle Farmer's Market, or her victory over Amanda Freitag in the finale of The Next Iron Chef as Guarnaschelli did not hold the title Iron Chef during either battle.
 Morimoto's record includes his battle as a competitor in the Battle of the Masters. It does not include his 16–7–1 record in the original Iron Chef during his tenure as the third Iron Chef Japanese.
 Symon's record does not include his loss to Morimoto in Battle Asparagus, or his victory over John Besh in the finale of The Next Iron Chef as Symon did not hold the title Iron Chef during either battle.
 Zakarian's record does not include his loss to Morimoto in Battle Sardines, or his victory over Elizabeth Falkner in the finale of The Next Iron Chef as Zakarian did not hold the title Iron Chef during either battle.
 Izard's record does not include her victories in Iron Chef Gauntlet as Izard did not hold the title Iron Chef at that time, nor her 2–0 record on Iron Chef Showdown.

References
General

Specific

Iron Chef America
America episodes